Begonia davisii is a plant in the begonia family, Begoniaceae, which was used in the early days of breeding Begonia × tuberhybrida cultivars.

It was discovered by the Victorian plant collector Walter Davis (after whom it was named) near Arequipa in Peru and was first introduced to England in 1877.

Description

Hybridization
The dwarf habit and erect flowers characteristic of this species were taken advantage of by John Seden, who rapidly evolved several garden forms, including a dwarf race of hybrids suitable for summer-bedding which became popular in Victorian England.
 
The cultivar, B. davisii Orangeade, which has double bright copper–orange flowers, is available commercially today.

References

External links

davisii
Flora of Peru
Garden plants
Veitch Nurseries